University is a community in Minneapolis. It is composed of six smaller neighborhoods. It also contains the University of Minnesota campus and the Mid-City Industrial Area, which is not assigned to an official neighborhood.

Official neighborhoods in the University community
Cedar-Riverside, also known as the West Bank
Como
Marcy-Holmes part of this neighborhood contains an area more commonly known as Dinkytown.
Nicollet Island/East Bank
Prospect Park
University

References

Communities in Minneapolis